Ann-Helen Moen (born 29 November 1969 in Molde, Norway) is a Norwegian lyric soprano from Molde, Norway, currently residing in 
Saffron Walden, United Kingdom.

Biography 
A graduate of the Grieg Academy (University of Bergen) and the Opera Academy in Copenhagen, Moen was a soloist at the opera in Graz, Austria, from 2001 to 2004 and has since performed for such companies as Den Nye Opera (Bergen), Hanover State Opera, the Norwegian National Opera, Trieste Opera and Zürich Opera (with the conductor William Christie). She appears regularly in concert, especially at Scandinavian music festivals: highlights include appearing as Solveig in Bentein Baardson's production of Peer Gynt in front of the Sphinx of Giza and her debut at Carnegie Hall with Leif Ove Andsnes in 2005.

Moen was a full-time soloist of Opera Graz, Austria, and her debut album, Catharinus Elling: Haugtussa and German Lieder, was released on SIMAX in 2009, awarded dice 5 by the Norwegian newspaper Bergens Tidende critique. She recited famous arias from operas, operettas and musicals, together with the young Norwegian tenor Erlend Tvinnereim at the Trondheim Chamber Music Festival 2013.

Honors 
Belvedere Competition, Vienna: special prize
Queen Sonja International Music Competition, 1999: best Norwegian artist
The Esso Prize, 2000

Discography

Solo albums 
2009: Catharinus Elling: Haugtussa and German Lieder (Simax Classics), with, Gunilla Süssmann (piano)

Collaborations 
1989: Herdens Flöjt - Julsånger På Pan-flöjt (Kirkelig Kulturverksted), with Roar Engelberg
1992: Landskap Av Stemmer (Kirkelig Kulturverksted), with SKRUK

Operatic roles 
Laura Wingfield, The Glass Managerie, Bibalo
Micaela, Carmen, Bizet 
Anne Pedersdotter, E.Fliflet Bræin
The Scottish Margarethe, The Maid of Norway, K.Habbestad
Nina, Rebekka, G.E.Haugland
Lisaura, Alessandro, Handel
Almirena,Rinaldo, Handel
Semele, Handel
Åse, King and Marshall, Heise 
Julia, Der Vetter uas Dingsda, Künneke
Poppea, L'incoronazione di Poppea, Monteverdi
Sandrina, la finta giardiniera, Mozart 
Contessa, Le Nozze di Figaro, Mozart 
Donna Elvira / Zerlina, Don Giovanni, Mozart 
Pamina / Papagena, Die Zaüberflöte, Mozart
Lauretta, Gianni Schicchi, Puccini 
Belinda, Dido and Æeneas, Purcell
Echo, Ariadne auf Naxos, Richard Strauss 
Ann Trulove, The Rake's Progress, Stravinsky
Tatyana, Eugen Onegin, Tchaikovsky

References

External links 

Agent

1969 births
Living people
Musicians from Molde
Norwegian operatic sopranos
University of Bergen alumni